Hensler is an unincorporated rural village in Oliver County, North Dakota, United States, located along the BNSF railroad tracks near North Dakota Highway 200,  southwest of Washburn. The village offers a county social services office and a grain elevator.

Climate
This climatic region is typified by large seasonal temperature differences, with warm to hot (and often humid) summers and cold (sometimes severely cold) winters.  According to the Köppen Climate Classification system, Hensler has a humid continental climate, abbreviated "Dfb" on climate maps.

References

Unincorporated communities in Oliver County, North Dakota
Unincorporated communities in North Dakota